Poinciana is an album by jazz pianist Ahmad Jamal, mostly recorded at the Spotlite Club in Washington, DC in 1958 and originally released in 1963. The title song is probably the 45 rpm studio version.

Track listing 
 "Poinciana" (Nat Simon, Buddy Bernier) – 2:58
 "You Don't Know What Love Is" (Don Raye, Gene de Paul) – 4:21
 "A Gal in Calico" (Arthur Schwartz, Leo Robin) – 4:45
 "Ivy" (Hoagy Carmichael) – 2:45
 "Tater Pie" (Ashby) – 2:56
 "Autumn Leaves" (Joseph Kosma, Jacques Prévert, Johnny Mercer) – 7:34
 "This Can't Be Love" (Richard Rodgers, Lorenz Hart) – 4:48
 "Old Devil Moon" (Yip Harburg, Burton Lane) – 3:50

Personnel 
 Ahmad Jamal – piano
 Israel Crosby – bass
 Ray Crawford – guitar
 Vernel Fournier – drums

References

External links 
 "Ahmad Jamal's Recording of 'Poinciana' Turns Fifty" by Ted Gioia (www.jazz.com)

Ahmad Jamal live albums
1963 live albums
Argo Records live albums